Tom De Mul (born 4 March 1986) is a Belgian former professional footballer who played as a right winger.

Club career
Born in Kapellen, Antwerp, De Mul began his career in K.F.C. Germinal Beerschot, but joined the AFC Ajax youth academy at age 15 like compatriot Thomas Vermaelen a year before. He made his first-team debut on 25 January 2004 against NEC Nijmegen, but appeared only eight times in the Eredivisie in his first two years combined.

After a solid 2005–06 (spent on loan) at Vitesse Arnhem, De Mul returned to Amsterdam and figured prominently during his first full year, starting in 23 of the 28 matches he appeared in. In the subsequent off-season he signed with Spanish side Sevilla FC for five years, but spent the vast majority of his first seasons barred by Jesús Navas, a club youth product; however, on 16 November 2008, having only played five minutes at Getafe CF, he scored in a 2–0 La Liga away win.

On 15 January 2009, De Mul agreed to be loaned to K.R.C. Genk, thus returning to his country. Seriously injured during the summer, he spent the entire 2009–10 and 2011–12 campaigns on the sidelines, eventually leaving the Andalusians on 30 June 2012 after his contract expired.

On 22 May 2014, almost two years after his contract with Sevilla expired, De Mul announced his retirement from football citing recurrent injuries.

International career
In June 2007, De Mul earned his two caps for the Belgium national team at senior level during UEFA Euro 2008 qualifying, making his debut on the 2nd as a 61st-minute substitute for François Sterchele in a 2–1 loss to Portugal at the Stade Roi Baudouin in Brussels. He started four days later, in a 2–0 defeat in Finland.

De Mul started in all six matches in the 2008 Summer Olympics, as the nation came fourth in China.

Honours
Ajax
Eredivisie: 2003–04
KNVB Cup: 2006–07
Johan Cruijff Shield: 2006

Sevilla
Supercopa de España: 2007 
UEFA Super Cup: Runner-up 2007

Genk
Belgian Cup: 2008–09

References

External links
Stats at Voetbal International 

1986 births
Living people
People from Kapellen, Belgium
Belgian footballers
Association football wingers
Belgian Pro League players
Beerschot A.C. players
K.R.C. Genk players
Standard Liège players
Eredivisie players
AFC Ajax players
SBV Vitesse players
La Liga players
Sevilla FC players
Belgium youth international footballers
Belgium under-21 international footballers
Belgium international footballers
Footballers at the 2008 Summer Olympics
Olympic footballers of Belgium
Belgian expatriate footballers
Expatriate footballers in the Netherlands
Expatriate footballers in Spain
Belgian expatriate sportspeople in the Netherlands
Belgian expatriate sportspeople in Spain
Footballers from Antwerp Province